The 55th Street station is a local station on the BMT West End Line of the New York City Subway, located at the intersection of 55th Street and 13th Avenue in Borough Park, Brooklyn. It is served by the D train at all times. The station opened in 1916, and had its platforms extended in the 1960s.

History
55th Street station opened on June 24, 1916 along with the first portion of the BMT West End Line from 36th Street on the BMT Fourth Avenue Line to 18th Avenue station. The line was originally a surface excursion railway to Coney Island, called the Brooklyn, Bath and Coney Island Railroad, which was established in 1862, but did not reach Coney Island until 1864. Under the Dual Contracts of 1913, an elevated line was built over New Utrecht Avenue, 86th Street and Stillwell Avenue.

The station house was renovated as part of the Metropolitan Transportation Authority's 2005-2009 Capital Program. Square windows were installed in the mezzanine and chain link fences separate the street stairs from the platform ones.

Station layout

This elevated station has three tracks and two side platforms. The D train stops here at all times, and the center express track is not normally used in service. Both platforms have beige windscreens along the entire length and beige canopies with green frames and support columns in the center. The station signs are in the standard black plates in white lettering.

Exits
The station's only entrance/exit is an elevated station house beneath the tracks. It has three staircases from the streets, one on the northeast corner of 55th Street and New Utrecht Avenue and two to either southern corners. Inside the station house, there is a token booth, turnstiles and two staircases to each platform at the center. The waiting area inside fare control allows free transfer between directions.

References

External links 

 
 Station Reporter — D Train
 The Subway Nut — 55th Street Pictures 
 55th Street entrance from Google Maps Street View
 Platforms from Google Maps Street View

BMT West End Line stations
New York City Subway stations in Brooklyn
Railway stations in the United States opened in 1916
1916 establishments in New York City
Borough Park, Brooklyn